Mary Francis Butts, (13 December 1890 – 5 March 1937) also Mary Rodker by marriage, was an English modernist writer. Her work found recognition in literary magazines such as The Bookman and The Little Review, as well as from fellow modernists, T. S. Eliot, H.D. and Bryher. After her death, her works fell into obscurity until they began to be republished in the 1980s.

Life
Butts was born on 13 December 1890 in Poole, Dorset, the daughter of Mary Jane (née Briggs) and Captain Frederick John Butts. She had a younger brother, Anthony. In later life she and her brother were estranged. Her great-grandfather was Thomas Butts, the friend of William Blake, the poet and artist. She was brought up at Salterns, an 18th-century house overlooking Poole Harbour (described in her book, The Crystal Cabinet: My Childhood at Salterns), where she became an admirer of the Blake watercolors which her father had inherited. In 1905 her father died; after which she was sent for a boarding school education at St Leonard's school for girls in St Andrews (1905–1908). In 1906 her mother sold the Blake paintings and in 1907 remarried. From 1909 to 1912 Mary studied at Westfield College in London, where she first became aware of her bisexual feelings. She did not complete a degree there, but was sent down for organising a trip to Epsom races. She went on to study at the London School of Economics, from which she graduated in 1914.

She became a student of the occultist Aleister Crowley. She and other students worked with Crowley on his Magick (Book 4) (1912) and were given co-authorship credit.

In 1916, she began keeping the diary which she would maintain until the year of her death.

In the first years of World War I, she was living in London, undertaking social work for the London County Council in Hackney Wick, and in a lesbian relationship. She then met the modernist poet, John Rodker, a pacifist at that time hiding in Dorking with fellow poet and pacifist Robert Trevelyan. In May 1918 she married Rodker, and in November 1920 gave birth to their daughter, Camilla Elizabeth. Butts also adopted Rodker's pacifism. She helped Rodker to set up as a publisher, and through him she met several modernist writers, including Ezra Pound, Wyndham Lewis, Ford Madox Ford, Roger Fry and May Sinclair. Shortly after the birth of her daughter she began a liaison with Cecil Maitland.

During the early 1920s Butts was mostly in Paris, where she became friends there with several writers and artists, including the painter Cedric Morris (a friend of her brother) and the artist, poet, and filmmaker Jean Cocteau, who illustrated her book, Imaginary Letters (1928). In mid-1921 she and Maitland spent about twelve weeks at Aleister Crowley's Abbey of Thelema in Sicily; she found the practices there shocking, and came away with a drug habit. In 1922 and 1923 she and Maitland spent periods near Tyneham, Dorset, and her novels of the 1920s make much of the Dorset landscape. In 1923 her book of stories, Speed the Plough and other stories was published; which was followed in 1925 by her first novel, Ashe of Rings (published by Robert McAlmon). Ashe of Rings is an anti-war novel with supernatural elements.

In 1927, she and Rodker were divorced. In 1928, Butts published Armed with Madness a novel featuring experimental Modernist writing revolving around the Grail legend. In 1930, she married the homosexual artist, William Park "Gabriel" Atkin or Aitken (1897–1937) (Mary then styled herself Mrs Aitken, but retained her maiden name for her writings). After a time in London and Newcastle, they settled in 1932 at Sennen on the Penwith peninsula on the western tip of Cornwall, but by 1934 the marriage had failed.

Butts was an ardent advocate of nature conservation, and attacked the pollution of the English countryside in her pamphlets Warning To Hikers and Traps For Unbelievers.

In 1933, at Sennen, she was introduced to the young novelist, Frank Baker, by George Manning-Sanders. Some time later, when Baker was living at Halamanning Valley with his friend John Raynor, she and Baker met again and became friends. They became members of the congregation of St Hilary's church, where Fr. Bernard Walke would produce nativity plays broadcast by the BBC.

Shortly before her death, she was working on a study of emperor Julian the Apostate. She died on 5 March 1937, at the age of forty-six, at the West Cornwall Hospital, Penzance, after an operation for a perforated gastric ulcer. Her funeral was held at St Sennen's Church, Sennen. Her autobiography, The Crystal Cabinet, was published a few months after her death.  Her brother, Anthony, committed suicide in 1941 by throwing himself out of a window.

Legacy
A portrait of Mary Butts was painted in 1924 by Cedric Morris, and a portrait drawing of her was made by Jean Cocteau (reproduced as a frontispiece to her memoir, The Crystal Cabinet).

Mary Butts's papers are held at the Beinecke Library at Yale University. Her biography, by N. Blondel, appeared in 1998.

Published works
1912  Magick (Book 4), by Aleister Crowley, Butts given co-authorship credit
1923  Speed the Plough and other Stories
1925  Ashe of Rings
1928  Armed with Madness
1928  Imaginary Letters
1932  Death of Felicity Taverner
1932  Traps for Unbelievers
1932  Several Occasions
1932  Warning to Hikers
1933  The Macedonian [a study of king Alexander of Macedon]
1935  Scenes from the Life of Cleopatra
1937  The Crystal Cabinet: My Childhood at Salterns [autobiography]
1938  Last Stories

Most of her books were reprinted in the late 1980s and 1990s.

References

Further reading
 D'Arfey, William (pseudonym of Anthony Butts & William Plomer), Curious Relations. Fictionalised family memoirs of Mary Butts's brother.
 Andrew Radford, 'Mary Butts and British Neo-Romanticism.  Bloomsbury, (2014)
 Nigel Jackson, 'Obscene Icons: Desacralization & Counter-Tradition in the Work of Mary Butts' in 'Sacrum Regnum II' (2013)
 Mary Butts, The Journals of Mary Butts Edited by Nathalie Blondel (2000. Yale U.P.)
 R. Reso Foy, Ritual, Myth and Mysticism in the Work of Mary Butts ... (2000)
 Nathalie Blondel, Mary Butts Scenes from the Life (1998)
 C. Wagstaff, A Sacred Quest: the life and writings of Mary Butts (1998)
 Frank Baker, 'Mary Butts', in F. Baker, I Follow But Myself (1968), p. 114–148
 Mary Butts, [extracts from her journals, prefaced with an article, 'Mary Butts', by R. H. Byington and G. E. Morgan], in Art and Literature; 7 (1965 winter), p. 162-
 Mary Butts, The Crystal Cabinet: My Childhood at Salterns (1937), reprinted (1988)

External links

 
 
 
 Mary Butts Papers. General Collection, Beinecke Rare Book and Manuscript Library, Yale University.

1890 births
1937 deaths
People educated at St Leonards School
Modernist women writers
People from Poole
English pacifists
English Thelemites
20th-century English novelists
British LGBT writers